The Spiral Notebook is the third solo album by Canadian rock guitarist Rik Emmett, released in 1995.

Track listing
All Songs written by Rik Emmett

 "Anything You Say" – 4:07
 "Raise High" – 5:43
 "The Longing" – 5:21
 "Talk it Over" – 4:44
With Karen Leblanc
 "Casey's on a Roll" – 4:26
 "Let Me be the One" – 3:48
 "Little Bitta Love" – 3:03
 "Silent Revolutions" – 4:47
 "The Numbers Game" – 3:40
 "The Pendulum" – 4:27
 "The Hardest Part" – 4:48

Personnel
 Rik Emmett – guitars, synthesizers, vocals
 Neil Chapman – rhythm guitar
 Steve Skingley – bass
 Randy Cooke – percussion, conga, overdubs, shaker, tambourine
 Charlie Cooley – drums
 Marty Anderson – keyboards, pre-programming, engineer, programming
 Karen Leblanc – vocals on "Talk it Over"
 Kaytalin Kiss – background vocals
 Kathy Martorino – background vocals

Production
 Rik Emmett – producer
 Ed Stone – engineer, mixing, overdub engineer
 Fraser Hill – engineer, overdub engineer, mixing
 Andrew Frank – engineer, mixing
 Everett Ravestein – engineer
 Rob Laidlan – assistant engineer
 Bill Kipper – mastering, sequencing
 Andrew MacNaughtan – photography
 Michael Wrycraft – art direction, illustration, design

Singles 
"Let Me be the One/Anything You Say" - Vanguard PRO-821; released March 9, 1995 (Canada)
"Anything You Say/Casey's on a Roll/Little Bitta Love" - Vanguard PRO-713; released March 14, 1995 (Canada)
"Anything You Say/Raise High/The Longing" - Intercord 988.189; released March 21, 1995 (Holland)

Charts

Album

Singles

External links
 The Spiral Notebook at the Official Rik Emmett Homepage

Rik Emmett albums
1995 albums
Vanguard Records albums